Old Brush Arbors is an album by American country music artist George Jones released in 1965 on the Musicor Records label.

Background
Jones's fondness for gospel music is well documented.  In the 1989 documentary Same Ole Me, he recalls that he learned how to play the guitar at the church where his mother Clara, a devout woman, played piano.  The church was run by Brother Burl Stephens (with whom Jones would credit as co-writer of several songs on his 1959 gospel album Country Church Time) and Sister Annie, who George remembered "taught me my first chords on the guitar, like C, G, and D and things like that, and I started hangin' out over there more often.  She'd get her guitar and we'd pick and sing together...We used to do all the really old gospel songs."   Jones love of gospel music actually predated his exposure to country music, which he would not hear until his family acquired their first radio.  Jones would continue to record gospel albums throughout his career, including In a Gospel Way (1974) and The Gospel Collection (2003).

Track listing 
 "Old Brush Arbors" (Gordon Ardis, Darrell Edwards)
 "Will There Be Stars in My Crown?" (George Jones Jimmy Sweeney, Edmond Hewitt)
 "Leaning on the Everlasting Arms" (Elisha A. Hoffman, Anthony J. Showalter)
 "Won't It Be Wonderful There?" (George Jones)
 "Lord You've Been Mighty Good to Me" (Earl Montgomery)
 "Selfishness in Man" (Leon Payne)
 "I'll Fly Away" (Albert E. Brumley)
 "Where We'll Never Grow Old" (James C. Moore)
 "If You Believe" (Darrell Edwards)
 "Lily of the Valley" (Charles William Fry, William Shakespeare Hays)
 "How Beautiful Heaven Must Be" (A.P. Bland, A.S. Bridgewater)
 "Well It's All Right" (Cindy Walker)

References

External links
 George Jones' Official Website

1965 albums
George Jones albums
Albums produced by Pappy Daily
Musicor Records albums
Gospel albums by American artists